The men's changquan competition at the 2010 Asian Games in Guangzhou, China was held on 13 November at the Nansha Gymnasium.

Schedule
All times are China Standard Time (UTC+08:00)

Results
Legend
DNS — Did not start

References

Results

External links
Official website

Men's changquan